Kuthirappuzha is a tributary of Chaliyar in the Kerala state of India. The river joins Chaliyar at Vadapuram (behind Kerala state wood industries limited) near Nilambur. Kuthirappuzha is originating from forests south-west of Upper Bhavani reservoir in Nilgiris district of Tamil Nadu. It flows through Kalikavu town and on reaching Koorad,  Kottappuzha joins with Kuthirappuzha.

Rivers of Malappuram district